Raja Club Athletic 63rd year in existence, they finished 4th last season and will be hoping to finish 1st so that they have the opportunity to play in the 2013 Club World Cup which is being held in Morocco. They start the season off with a new president Mohamed Boudrika who brought back manager Mohamed Fakhir who had previous spells with Raja CA winning the league and Moroccan Cup as they were looking at bringing back the glory.

Players

First team squad

Reserve team squad

Transfers

In

Out

Loan out

Squad statistics

Appearances and goals

[L] - Out on loan
[S] - Sold

Top scorers

Disciplinary record

Competitions

Friendly matches

First team matches
With Lots of new signings coming in Raja CA prepared a lot of Friendly Matches to get the team ready for the new season. Raja had a very good pre-season winning most of their matches and only losing once.

2012 Tournoi Antifi 
The tournament is held in honor of the late Ahmed Antifi, a former leader of the hosts Racing de Casablanca and former vice-president of the Royal Moroccan Football Federation.

Teams:
Racing de Casablanca (Hosts)
Raja CA
Wydad Casablanca
FUS Rabat
FAR Rabat
Maghreb Fez
Difaa El Jadida
Moghreb Tetouan

Group stage

Botola

League table

Results

Coupe du Trone

Round of 32

Round of 16

Quarter final

Semi final

Final

Arab Champions League

First round

Quarter final

Semi final

Reserve team matches

Preseason
The reserve team also had a lot of Pre-season matches to build a strong team.

Elite 1: Espoirs

Challenge Espoirs
Last 16

Quarter - Final

Overall statistics

References

External links
  

Raja CA seasons